Lačaves is a settlement in the hills northeast of Ormož in northeastern Slovenia. It lies next to the village of Kog, close to the border with Croatia. The area belongs to the traditional region of Styria and is now included in the Drava Statistical Region.

References

External links
Lačaves on Geopedia

Populated places in the Municipality of Ormož